The 2016–17 Kazakhstan Hockey Championship was the 25th season since the founding of the Kazakhstan Hockey Championship.

Teams

Regular season

Standings

Play-off

Quarterfinals 
Arlan Kokshetau defeated ShKO Oskemen 3 games to none
HC Temirtau defeated Beibarys Atyrau 3 games to none
Nomad Astana defeated HC Almaty 3 games to 1
Yertis Pavlodar defeated Kulager Petropavl 3 games to 2

Semifinals 
HC Temirtau defeated Arlan Kokshetau 4 games to 3
Nomad Astana defeated Yertis Pavlodar 4 games to none

Finals 
Nomad Astana defeated Arystan Temirtau 4 games to 3

References

Kazakhstan Hockey Championship seasons
Kazakhstan Hockey Championship
1